Paroa is a tehsil located in Dera Ismail Khan District, Khyber Pakhtunkhwa, Pakistan. The population is 292,466 according to the 2017 census.

See also 
 List of tehsils of Khyber Pakhtunkhwa

References 

Tehsils of Khyber Pakhtunkhwa
Populated places in Dera Ismail Khan District